The Billiards and Snookers Congress of the Philippines (BSCP), also known as the Billiard Sports Confederation of the Philippines, is the national governing body for cue sports in the Philippines.

In 2016, The Philippine Olympic Committee (POC) took over the leadership of BSCP due to the board's failure to have an election of their new officials. POC legal counsel Attorney Ramon Malinao will serve as the interim president of the federation until the issues are resolved.

References

External links 
 Billiard Sports Confederation of the Philippines profile at the Philippine Olympic Committee website 

Cue sports governing bodies
Carom billiards organizations
Pool organizations
Snooker governing bodies
Billiard Sports
Cue sports in the Philippines